Jemima is a feminine given name of Hebrew origin (first written Jemimah, Hebrew: יְמִימָה, Yemimah) meaning dove which may refer to:

People 
 Jemima Blackburn (1823–1909), Scottish painter
 Jemima Boone, daughter of Daniel Boone captured by Indians in 1776—see Capture and rescue of Jemima Boone
 Jemima Goldsmith (born 1974), English journalist, editor, heiress and activist
 Jemimah Kariuki, Kenyan doctor
 Jemima Kirke (born 1985), English-American actress
 Jemima Montag (born 1998), Australian female racewalker 
 Jemima Morrell (1832–1909), English traveller and illustrator 
 Jemima Nicholas (1755–1832), Welsh woman who captured 12 drunk French soldiers in the Battle of Fishguard, the "last invasion of Britain"
 Jemima Osunde, Nigerian actress, model and presenter
 Jemima Parry-Jones (born 1949), British authority on birds of prey, conservationist and author
 Jemima Rooper (born 1981), English actress
 Jemima Sumgong (born 1984), Kenyan long-distance runner
 Jemima von Tautphoeus (1807–1893), Irish novelist
 Jemima West (born 1987), Anglo-French actress
 Jemima Wilkinson (1752–1819), American preacher and evangelist
 Jemima Yorke, 2nd Marchioness Grey (1723–1797)

Biblical and fictional characters 

 Jemima (Bible), daughter of Job
 Jemima (cat), a character in the musical Cats
 Jemima, a duck in the children's book The Tale of Jemima Puddle-Duck by Beatrix Potter
 Jemima, a doll in the various versions of the television show Play School
 Jemima Potts, the daughter in the 1968 film Chitty Chitty Bang Bang
 Jemima "Jed" Marshall, the villain's mistress in the novel The Night Manager by John le Carré and on the British TV mini-series of the same name
 Jemima Shore, an investigative journalist in a series of crime novels by Antonia Fraser
 Aunt Jemima, an advertising character for a food brand
 Old Aunt Jemima, a blackface minstrel character

References

English feminine given names
Given names derived from birds